The Fat Leonard scandal is an ongoing investigation and prosecution of corruption within the United States Navy during the 2000s and 2010s. It has involved ship support contractor Glenn Defense Marine Asia (GDMA), a Thai subsidiary of the Glenn Marine Group. The Washington Post called the scandal "perhaps the worst national-security breach of its kind to hit the Navy since the end of the Cold War." The company's chief executive, president, and chairman, Malaysian national Leonard Glenn Francis ("Fat Leonard") bribed a large number of uniformed officers of the United States Seventh Fleet with at least a half million dollars in cash, plus travel expenses, luxury items, carousals and prostitutes, in return for classified material about the movements of U.S. ships and submarines, confidential contracting information, and information about active law enforcement investigations into Glenn Defense Marine Asia. Francis then "exploited the intelligence for illicit profit, brazenly ordering his moles to redirect aircraft carriers, ships and subs to ports he controlled in Southeast Asia so he could more easily bilk the Navy for fuel, tugboats, barges, food, water and sewage removal." The Navy, through GDMA, even employed divers to search harbors for explosives. He also directed them to author "Bravo Zulu" memos, which is an informal term for a letter of commendation from the Navy given to civilians who have performed outstanding services for the Navy, in order to bolster GDMA's credibility for jobs "well done".

The first activities of the conspiracy were confirmed to have existed in 2006 when Francis recruited numerous Navy personnel to engage in corruption, including directing contracts toward his firm, disfavoring competitors, and inhibiting legitimate fiscal and operational oversight. The initial co-conspirators labeled themselves "the cool kids" and "the wolf pack."

U.S. federal prosecutors filed criminal charges against 33 individuals in connection with the Fat Leonard scandal. Of those, 22 pleaded guilty: Francis himself, four of his top aides, and 17 Navy officials (specifically, at least ten commissioned officers, two petty officers, one former NCIS special agent, and two civilian Navy contracting officials). Nine others are awaiting trial in U.S. district court in San Diego. Separately, five Navy officers were charged with crimes under the Uniform Code of Military Justice (UCMJ) and were subject to court-martial proceedings. An additional civilian pleaded guilty to a scandal-related crime in a Singapore court.

Suffering health problems, Francis was hospitalized and released in March 2018. Rather than returning to the custody of the U.S. Marshals Service, he was granted a medical furlough and at first allowed to stay in San Diego at a private residence owned by one of his physicians, under 24-hour surveillance for which his family paid. At a deposition taken in 2018 in the David A. Morales case, Francis said he was being treated for kidney cancer.

On September 4, 2022, Francis escaped home confinement by cutting off his ankle monitor and disappeared. He fled to Mexico, chartered a flight to Cuba, then flew on to Caracas, Venezuela, where he was apprehended, seventeen days after beginning his escape, preparing to board a flight to Russia.

Initiation and conduct of investigation

Discounting whistleblower warnings
In 2006, Dave Schaus, a Naval officer, became suspicious of GDMA contracts, but Francis was alerted by an informant, Paul Simpkins, to the scrutiny. Simpkins, a decorated veteran of the U.S. Air Force employed as a civilian contracting officer by the Navy in Singapore, managed to quash any inquiry and had Schaus' position eliminated. "What else could I have done to expose this racket?," Schaus asked. Exposed as a whistleblower, he said officers, "made my life hell" after discovering he had attempted to initiate an investigation of GDMA.

In 2007, the Navy's Inspector General forwarded a document claiming GDMA was grossly overcharging the Navy for providing port security but the Naval Criminal Investigative Service (NCIS) may have failed to follow up on the warning. According to a senior Navy officer, "Everybody knew that [Glenn Defense] had been under investigation." "Everybody also knew that nothing ever happened with those investigations." After that, the Manila NCIS office got an anonymous letter and documents, alleging GDMA had overcharged for fees, armed guards and other services during a Subic Bay, Philippines port visit by the Fred Stockham container support ship. "I hope you share the same concern when reading these documents and take swift action to stamp out this fraud, waste and abuse," the letter said.

Manila's NCIS agents forwarded the paperwork to the Navy's Singapore contracting office, but it had been infiltrated by GDMA's moles, and they claimed the allegations were false, closing the case. Mike Lang, a contracting officer who worked there from 2006 to 2008, said, "They'd always side with Glenn Defense and paint us as troublemakers. They'd say, 'Why are you harassing our contractors? You're making my job hard'."

Two officials from that office, Simpkins and his subordinate, Sharon Gursharan Kaur who was also a civilian Navy contracting officer, as well as a former GDMA employee, were sentenced to six years and 33 months, respectively, with Kaur doing her time in Singapore. NCIS reportedly opened and closed as many as 27 investigations without taking action against GDMA.  NCIS failed to provide an explanation for its lack of action in a significant fraud investigation.

Tepid responses
Documents obtained by The Washington Post via Freedom of Information Act Requests (FOIAs) revealed that after al-Qaeda committed the October 2000 suicide attack on the USS Cole and the September 11, 2001 attacks on the World Trade Center and the Pentagon, the Navy's Economic Crimes unit was reduced from a staff of 140 to only nine persons, most having been reassigned to focus on terrorism.  At least 27 separate investigations had been opened, but later closed without action, thanks to the intervention of senior Navy personnel who were in league with Francis.

The lack of enthusiasm for oversight might have been motivated in part by GDMA's demonstrable ability to deliver the sometimes complex level of services the Navy sought. In 2016, Commander Mike Misiewicz, an officer who was later convicted, told Defense News, "He was a crook, but he was our crook." John Hogan, the NCIS executive assistant director for criminal operations, admitted, "In hindsight, maybe we could have dug a little deeper than we did."

Ray Mabus, who was appointed Navy Secretary by President Barack Obama in 2009, admitted his branch was vulnerable to contracting fraud and should have performed better oversight: "I'm not going to defend at all opening and closing 27 cases. Something should have raised a red flag along there somewhere...There were people inside the Navy who were trying to shut this down, who were coming up with reasons not to pursue it." In 2010, a civilian Navy attorney drafted restrictive ethics guidelines for the 7th Fleet. Two admirals friendly to Francis were said to be responsible for seeing that they were delayed and diluted over the next  years, before being implemented.

Eventual actions
In 2010, Navy officials became suspicious that some of the bills submitted by GDMA from Thailand were padded. The escalating costs prompted the Navy to build a logistics team to keep contracts somewhat in check, but it was frustrated because Francis had a spy, Jose Luis Sanchez, feeding the team's information back to Francis. Sanchez later pleaded guilty to conspiracy and in 2022, awaits sentencing.  Despite the increasing awareness that the Navy was being subjected to massive fraud, GDMA was able to contract to deliver $200 million in services in 2011 alone.

After a three-year investigation and having planted false information that their inquiries had been closed, putting Francis off his guard, federal agents lured him to the United States. In September 2013, he was arrested at a San Diego hotel in a sting operation. He pleaded guilty in January 2015 and was awaiting sentencing. Due to medical problems, had been allowed to live under home detention beginning at least 2018 in San Diego. Due to be sentenced on September 22, 2022, he became a fugitive on September 5, after cutting off his ankle monitor.

Francis had admitted to using his U.S. Navy contacts, including ship captains, to obtain classified information and to defraud the Navy of tens of millions of dollars by having ships directed to specific ports which he serviced in the Pacific and falsifying service charges. In his plea, Francis identified seven Navy officials who accepted bribes. He faced a maximum prison sentence of 25 years and agreed to forfeit $35 million in personal assets, an amount he admitted to overcharging the Navy.

Scope of inquiry and prosecutions
Since 2013, 31 people have been criminally charged in connection with the Fat Leonard bribery and corruption scandal. According to investigators, by November 2017, more than 440 people — including 60 admirals — have come under scrutiny under the inquiry. The Navy held a military trial for a still-serving commander, David A. Morales, the first not left to civilian prosecution. He was charged with bribery, conspiracy to commit bribery, false official statements, failure to obey lawful orders, and conduct unbecoming an officer.  He was acquitted of the first three charges in a bench trial, only found guilty of failure to obey lawful orders and conduct unbecoming. As of September 2018, 30 people had pleaded guilty; 12 others had been charged (including eight Navy officers who were indicted in March 2017); four admirals were disciplined by the military; two others, four-star admiral Robert Willard and three-star Joe Donnelly, were known to be under investigation; and more than 150 other unidentified people have been scrutinized.

A March 2017 indictment made reference to "AG", a former officer in the Royal Australian Navy (RAN), who had been employed for several years as a liaison officer aboard . On May 3, 2018, the Australian Broadcasting Corporation identified "AG" as Lieutenant Commander Alex Gillett, reporting that he had resigned from the Navy after being questioned by the Australian Federal Police. A second unidentified Australian of similar rank was also reported to be under investigation. A memo of understanding between the U.S. Navy and the RAN allows for the possible extradition of Australian personnel to the United States for the purposes of prosecution.

Among the nineteen people who have pleaded guilty to federal crimes, one was Francis himself, two others were his top deputies; and sixteen others were Navy personnel. The highest-ranking was Rear Admiral Robert Gilbeau, who was convicted in June 2016 after pleading guilty to making false statements to investigators about his contacts with Francis, becoming the first Navy admiral in modern American history to be convicted of a felony while on active duty.  On May 17, 2017, U.S. District Judge Janis Lynn Sammartino sentenced Gilbeau to eighteen months in prison, although he was allowed to continue collecting his nearly $10,000 monthly pension.
He was being held in FCI Englewood, a low security federal prison in Littleton, Colorado, and was released on November 1, 2018.

Corporate governance expert Mak Yuen Teen of the National University of Singapore noted that procurement in the defense industry is particularly vulnerable to bribery and corruption. "It is usually not that transparent," with infrequent bidding for large contracts. Blowing the whistle on superior officers might also be discouraged, he indicated. "Those at the top probably thought they could get away with it as their underlings were unlikely to squeal on them."

According to its spokesman Captain Amy Derrick, the U.S. Navy canceled all contracts with GDMA as the result of a 2013 audit.

In the case of former Naval Intelligence chief, Vice Admiral Ted N. Branch, both the Navy and the Department of Justice declined to prosecute after a three-year investigation.

On June 29, 2022, after a 16-week trial, a jury found former Captains David Newland, James Dolan and David Lausman and former Commander Mario Herrera guilty of conspiracy to commit bribery, accepting bribes, and wire fraud in connection with their acceptance of bribes from Francis' company in exchange for information regarding the Navy's Seventh Fleet. Lausman was further convicted of obstruction of justice involving the destruction of a computer's hard drive containing materials from his time as commanding officer of the USS George Washington, an aircraft carrier. The jury was unable to reach a unanimous verdict on charges against former Rear Admiral Bruce Loveless, and charges against him were dropped in September 2022. On July 13, 2022, U.S. District Judge Janis Sammartino ruled that the lead federal prosecutor in the bribery and fraud trial of the five ex-Navy officers committed "flagrant misconduct" by withholding certain potentially exculpatory materials from defense lawyers (specifically, a statement by a prostitute involved with ). The judge concluded that prosecutors had violated the Brady rule rule, but not to the degree that caused her to dismiss the prosecution's case.

Francis's escape while on bail 

On September 4, 2022, Francis removed his ankle bracelet and fled his rented San Diego home. Francis had been living in the home with his mother and three children. Judge Sammartino had ordered 24-hour surveillance at Francis' expense but had expressed concerns in the past when a security guard had been absent from their post for hours. After he fled, his guards said they had been confined while on duty to a garage at his home.

In a closed-door hearing in 2018, the judge expressed concern that if Francis were to escape and ended up "back in Malaysia for whatever reason," it would be asked, "who let somebody do this without any security?" Neighbors reported that cars displaying out-of-state licenses were parked outside the home four days before the escape, and a U-Haul truck was there two days before Francis disappeared. It was believed he cut off his ankle monitor between 7:30 and 8:00 a.m. on September 4, and notice was only taken when a call was received by the San Diego police at 2:00 p.m. that day. When federal agents arrived, no security personnel were found to be present. Francis had been due in federal court on September 22, 2022, for sentencing. In November 2020, a bariatric surgeon who had been treating Francis for obesity wrote an unsolicited letter to the judge to inform her that the improvement in his condition gave him a clean bill of health. Francis had been scheduled to testify in the upcoming trials of five Naval officers and four others were scheduled to be sentenced in October 2022.

Recapture 
Francis was recaptured on September 22, 2022, seventeen days after his escape. He was arrested at Simón Bolívar International Airport outside Caracas, Venezuela, pursuant to an Interpol "red notice" as he was about to board a plane to Russia. He had flown from Mexico to Cuba, then on to Caracas. His children were not with him. The director-general of Interpol Venezuela disclosed the arrest, and said that Francis was handed to Venezuelan authorities for possible extradition proceedings. Although the U.S. and Venezuela have a limited extradition treaty, tense U.S.-Venezuelan relations may complicate extradition.

Leonard Francis requested asylum in Venezuela.

In mid-October 2022, Venezuela's highest court set a two-month deadline for the U.S. to file an extradition request to retrieve Francis.

Per Department of Justice policy, it refuses to comment on extradition requests until  persons sought have returned to the U.S.

Judge Sammartino scheduled a status hearing date for December 14 in San Diego.

Corruption prevention
The scope of the GDMA investigation inadvertently hindered the Navy's ability to fill senior leadership roles, unintentionally delayed hundreds of officers’ careers and depleted the Navy's admiralty. Hundreds of those who had not been compromised needed investigation and clearance. That stalled promotions for years according to Ray Mabus, the then-Secretary of the Navy (SECNAV).  "If Leonard Francis mentioned somebody's name, or it seemed to us that if somebody had served in a senior position in the Pacific during this time, which covered a lot of folks, they were caught up in this until their name could be pulled out." "It took in a huge percentage of flag officers, and it really hamstrung the Navy in terms of promotions, in terms of positions," with his opinion widely shared. The Department of Justice, however, had forwarded to the USN almost 450 names that they declined to prosecute. The Navy elected to take only a handful to courts-martial, issuing at least twelve letters of censure from Mabus and his successor, Richard V. Spencer, with some forty other administrative actions. In early 2018, there were roughly 170 names still pending before the Consolidated Disposition Authority (CDA). "It's really been pretty devastating to the upper ranks of the Navy," said Mabus. "There were bad people here. You gotta catch them. You got to make sure they're punished. But there were a lot of people that didn't do anything that got caught up in this."

A retired Admiral said. "At least with Tailhook, people knew that if they went to Tailhook they were being looked at. Right now, as far as anyone knows, if you ever went west of Hawaii, you're being looked at." Another senior U.S. Pacific Command staffer informed a room of Australians, regarding the ongoing case, "China could never have dreamt up a way to do this much damage to the U.S. Navy's Pacific leadership."

GDMA was able to provide services to meet more difficult standards than competitors could, 7th Fleet officers claimed. Francis had made himself indispensable.

In February 2018, Admiral Bill Moran, the Vice Chief of Naval Operations, announced the implementation of increased oversight and other measures and policies to deter a repeat of the widespread corruption in the "Fat Leonard" case. Glenn Fine, the principal deputy in the Office of the Inspector General (OIG) of the Department of Defense, said the Defense Criminal Investigative Service, the criminal investigative arm of the DOD's OIG, said GDMA, Francis’ contract firm, created a scheme to defraud the Navy of tens of millions of dollars via overbilling for supplying goods and services. The Navy created a Consolidated Disposition Authority (CDA) which was tasked with determining whether hundreds of Navy officers should be charged under the UCMJ, or alternatively, to be subjected to administrative actions. Fine said the CDA has already adjudicated 300-plus cases.
 The Navy, which had been posting the names of personnel who had been fired in the case on its website, announced in May 2018, that it will discontinue the practice. California Representative Jackie Speier, the ranking member of the House Armed Services Subcommittee on Military Personnel, objected to the change in policy, characterizing it as a reduction in transparency and a barrier to the public's "right to know."

The private sector used feedback surveys to assess personnel performance, a method the Army adopted in 2001. The Army's initiative helped identify serious ethics problems amongst leaders. Besides “command climate” surveys, "360" evaluations identified causes for discipline or oversight among its upper ranks. The Navy has not extended such feedback to gather information from lower-ranking personnel, however.

Between Francis' arrest and the end of 2016, the Navy suspended 566 vendors, permanently debarring 548 more from contracts, according to the government's Interagency Suspension and Debarment Committee. Those included Glenn Defense Marine Asia and 55 of its Pacific Rim affiliates. Public corruption watchdogs say that the internal revisions to the way the Navy deals with contractors are important, but the more difficult problem to remedy is a culture of corruption that poisoned the highest ranks of the U.S. Navy. "Very few service members get promoted because they blew the whistle on their boss," "If you don't get promoted, you get forced out of the service. If that happens before you are eligible for a retirement, you lose out on the lifetime pension. For most people, it is much safer to simply put your head down and keep going until 20 years," according to Dan Grazier, a Straus Military Reform Project fellow at Washington, D.C.'s Project on Government Oversight (POGO).

Two of those who were involved in the investigation and prosecution became finalists for the 2019 Service to America medals. They were Mark Pletcher, an assistant U.S. attorney for the southern district of California who worked on the case for six years and Jim McWhirter of the Office of Inspector General (OIG) at the Defense Criminal Investigative Service (DCIS).

Similar corruption
Similar details of a ship husbandry corruption case similar to "Fat Leonard" but centered in Korea were aired in July 2019. The Department of Justice has charged Sung-Yol “David” Kim, head of DK Marine Service, with counts of conspiracy and bribery, according to pleadings filed with the Eastern District of Michigan. The case also alleged cover-ups and coordination to obscure the overcharges.

Individuals involved
Except for the cases of Gursharan Kaur Sharon Rachael (who was tried in Singapore), Alex Gillett (who was tried in the Supreme Court of the Australian Capital Territory), and those of five persons charged in military courts (Captain John F. Steinberger, Commander David A. Morales, Commander Jason W. Starmer, Lt. Peter Vapor, and Chief Warrant Officer Brian T. Ware), all court proceedings as of March 15, 2021, have been in U.S. federal court. As of September 15, 2022, 29 defendants have pleaded guilty.  Captains David Newland, James Dolan, David Lausman, and Commander Mario Herrera were found guilty at trial. Donald Hornbeck and  Lieutenant Commander Stephen Shedd had entered not guilty pleas that remained outstanding; Shedd later entered a guilty plea. Their trials had been scheduled to begin on November 1, 2021, but were put off until February, 2022. Francis escaped from home confinement on September 4, 2022, flew to Mexico, then flew to Cuba, then to Caracas, Venezuela where he was apprehended by Interpol while awaiting a flight to Russia, on September 20, 2022. The United States began negotiating for his return but fractured diplomatic relations have impeded the extradition process.

References

External links
Q&A interview with Defense News naval warfare correspondent Chris Cavas on the topic of the Fat Leonard Scandal, May 7, 2017, C-SPAN
Fat Leonard podcast by Project Brazen, 2021

Federal Bureau of Investigation operations
Political corruption investigations in the United States
United States military scandals
Political corruption in the Philippines
United States Navy in the 21st century